George Roger Williams III (born December 8, 1975) is a former American football defensive lineman who last played for the San Jose SaberCats of the Arena Football League. Williams spent a total of seven seasons with the SaberCats; prior to this, he spent three years in the NFL.

Williams was born in Roseboro, North Carolina. He attended nearby Lakewood High School, where he played football; he continued to play football at North Carolina State University. Williams played for a total of four years at NC State; while he was not selected in the NFL Draft, he was ultimately signed by the New York Giants. Williams spent a total of three years with the Giants. While he never started a game for the team, he received substantial playing time; he appeared in 29 of the Giants' 32 regular season games in 1999 and 2000. Williams was on the team's roster when they advanced to Super Bowl XXXV, where they lost to the Baltimore Ravens by the lopsided score of 34–7. Following the loss, Williams was released from the team.

Williams ultimately signed with the San Jose SaberCats in May 2002. He was a key component of the SaberCats' mid-2000s run of success; over the seven years of his AFL career, the SaberCats reached four ArenaBowls (winning three). Williams was used mainly as a defensive lineman; at times, however, he was also used as a wide receiver. In 2007, his most productive year as a wide receiver, he caught five passes for 16 yards; all five catches, however, were for touchdowns. Williams' AFL career concluded with the SaberCats' loss to the Philadelphia Soul in ArenaBowl XXII. He finished his career with 78 tackles, 8 sacks, and 2 interceptions.

External links
 Arenafan Career Stats

1975 births
Living people
Players of American football from North Carolina
American football defensive linemen
Fresno State Bulldogs football players
New York Giants players
San Jose SaberCats players
People from Roseboro, North Carolina